Kawagoe may refer to:

Places
Kawagoe, Saitama, a city in Saitama Prefecture, Japan
Kawagoe, Mie, a town in Mie Prefecture, Japan
Kawagoe Domain, a former domain of Japan

Other uses
Kawagoe (surname)